Inglewhite is a small village in the parish of Goosnargh in Lancashire, England. It lies at the intersection of the roads from Longridge to Garstang and from Broughton to Beacon Fell.

Etymology
The origin of the name Inglewhite is uncertain. One popular interpretation is that the name means 'white fire', from the Gaelic aingeal meaning 'fire'. It is thought to refer to will-o'-the-wisps that were once prevalent on the village green.

History
The road names of Button Street and Silk Mill Lane indicate industries that once thrived near the village. The Congregational Chapel on Silk Mill Lane was founded in 1819. The village forge, which made ammunition boxes during the World War I, closed in 1992. The building housed a café for several years but is now closed.

Sites of special interest
In 2011, Preston City Council designated eight buildings in the village as sites of special interest:

Inglewhite Church
The Green Man at Inglewhite
Black Bull Cottage
Bridge Cottages
Barn on the Green
Agricultural building, Manor House Farm
Manor House Farmhouse
Sandersons Joiners

Amenities 
The public houses The Queens Arms and The Black Bull closed early in the 21st century, leaving only The Green Man.

Community
The village is closely linked to the nearly village of Whitechapel. WICE (Whitechapel and Inglewhite Community Enterprises) has been formed as a community organisation to enable a sustainable and resilient community.

See also

Listed buildings in Goosnargh

References

External links 

Photographs of Inglewhite at Geograph.co.uk
Inglewhite Congregational Church
Goosnargh at genuki.org.uk

Villages in Lancashire
Goosnargh